Polyrhachis exercita is a species of ant in the subfamily Formicinae, found in India, Sri Lanka, Bangladesh.

Subspecies
 Polyrhachis exercita exercita (Walker, 1859)    
 Polyrhachis exercita lucidiventris Forel, 1907 
 Polyrhachis exercita obtusisquama Forel, 1902 
 Polyrhachis exercita rastrata Emery, 1889

References

External links

 at antwiki.org
Animaldiversity.org
Itis.org

Formicinae
Hymenoptera of Asia
Insects described in 1859